Stupidity is the property a person, action or belief instantiates by virtue of having or being indicative of low intelligence or poor learning abilities.

Stupidity may also refer to

Stupidity (Bad Manners album) (2003)
Stupidity (Dr. Feelgood album) (1976)
Stupidity (film), a 2003 Canadian satirical documentary film